Isodemis brevicera is a moth of the family Tortricidae. It is found in Vietnam.

The wingspan is 21 mm. The ground colour of the forewings is cream, sparsely dotted and suffused with brownish especially at the base of the wing and along the dorsum. The markings are brownish with dark brown parts. The hindwings are pale brown grey.

Etymology
The specific epithet refers to the termination of the sacculus and is derived from Latin brevis (meaning short) and cera, from Greek keras (meaning a horn).

References

Moths described in 2009
Archipini
Moths of Asia
Taxa named by Józef Razowski